Three Doors to Death is a collection of Nero Wolfe mystery novellas by Rex Stout, published by the Viking Press in 1950 — itself collected in the omnibus volume Five of a Kind (Viking 1961). The book comprises three stories that first appeared in The American Magazine:

 "Man Alive" (December 1947)
 "Omit Flowers" (November 1948)
 "Door to Death" (June 1949)

Publication history
1950, New York: The Viking Press, April 21, 1950, hardcover
In his limited-edition pamphlet, Collecting Mystery Fiction #9, Rex Stout's Nero Wolfe Part I, Otto Penzler describes the first edition of Three Doors to Death: "Green cloth, front cover and spine printed with black; rear cover blank. Issued in a mainly reddish-orange dust wrapper."
In April 2006, Firsts: The Book Collector's Magazine estimated that the first edition of Three Doors to Death had a value of between $300 and $500. The estimate is for a copy in very good to fine condition in a like dustjacket.
1950, New York: Viking (Mystery Guild), August 1950, hardcover
The far less valuable Viking book club edition may be distinguished from the first edition in three ways:
 The dust jacket has "Book Club Edition" printed on the inside front flap, and the price is absent (first editions may be price clipped if they were given as gifts).
 Book club editions are sometimes thinner and always taller (usually a quarter of an inch) than first editions.
 Book club editions are bound in cardboard, and first editions are bound in cloth (or have at least a cloth spine).
1950, London: Collins Crime Club, September 18, 1950, hardcover
1952, New York: Dell (mapback by Rafael de Soto), 1952, #626, paperback
1961, New York: The Viking Press, Five of a Kind: The Third Nero Wolfe Omnibus (with The Rubber Band and In the Best Families), July 10, 1961, hardcover
1966, New York: Bantam #F3154, June 1966, paperback
1995, New York: Bantam Crimeline  February 1995, paperback
2010, New York: Bantam Crimeline  June 9, 2010, e-book

References

External links

 A Nero Wolfe Mystery — "Door to Death" at The Wolfe Pack, official site of the Nero Wolfe Society

1950 short story collections
Nero Wolfe short story collections
Viking Press books